M. Mohanan was born in India, in the Indian state of Kerala. He began writing in college and was encouraged by the actor Sreenivasan who gave him confidence writing scripts. Mohanan studied and lived with Sreenivasan while studying for his degree. Mohanan worked as Assistant Director with Sathyan Anthikad in 14 films. Mohanan is the recipient of Kerala State Film Awards for Best Story and Best Popular Film. His movies: 916, Manikyakkallu and Katha Parayumpol. His recent film is Aravindante Adhithikal (2018).

Filmography

References

Tamil screenwriters
Living people
People from Chavakachcheri
Screenwriters from Kerala
Tamil film directors
Year of birth missing (living people)